The 2022 Chevrolet Silverado 250 was the 21st stock car race of the 2022 NASCAR Camping World Truck Series, the second race of the Round of 8, and the 17th iteration of the event. The race was held on Saturday, October 1, 2022, in Lincoln, Alabama at Talladega Superspeedway, a  permanent tri-oval shaped superspeedway. The race was increased from 94 laps to 95 laps, due to a NASCAR overtime finish. In a wild finish that sparked controversy, Matt DiBenedetto, driving for Rackley WAR, would steal the win after the caution came out on the final lap. This was DiBenedetto's first career NASCAR Camping World Truck Series win, and the first of his career. To fill out the podium, Ben Rhodes, driving for ThorSport Racing, and Bret Holmes, driving for his family owned team, Bret Holmes Racing, would finish 2nd and 3rd, respectively.

The race would receive controversy on the final lap. In turn three, ThorSport Racing teammates, Ben Rhodes and Christian Eckes, were battling side by side for the lead. Eckes would make contact with Corey Heim, causing Heim to hit the outside wall and spin down the racetrack. Bret Holmes would make a move to the outside lane to try and pass Rhodes. As Rhodes attempted to block, Matt DiBenedetto came to the inside and tried to take the lead. Rhodes would force DiBenedetto below the double yellow line, and both drivers would get sideways as they came across the line. Holmes was declared as the unofficial winner after crossing the line in front of Rhodes and DiBenedetto. However, the caution came out just before the field took the checkered flag. DiBenedetto would officially be declared as the winner, as he was out front when the caution had come out. Rhodes and Holmes would be credited with a 2nd and 3rd place finish.

The race would also be marred by a crash involving Jordan Anderson. On lap 18, Anderson would blow an engine coming into turn two, causing his truck to engulf in flames. Struggling to breathe from smoke inhalation, Anderson attempted to exit his truck while it was still moving. His truck would hit the inside retaining wall, with Anderson already half way out of the truck. He would lay down on the ground shortly after exiting his car, with medical personnel arriving on the scene. Anderson was taken to the infield care center, where he received minor burns to his arms, neck, and knees. He would later be transported to a local hospital for further evaluation.

This would also be the debut race for Parker Retzlaff.

Background 
Talladega Superspeedway is located on the former Anniston Air Force Base in the small city of Lincoln. A tri-oval, the track was constructed in 1969 by the International Speedway Corporation, a business controlled by the France Family. , the track hosts the NASCAR Cup Series, NASCAR Xfinity Series, NASCAR Camping World Truck Series, and ARCA Menards Series. The total peak capacity of Talladega is around 175,000 spectators, with the main grandstand capacity being about 80,000.

Entry list 

 (R) denotes rookie driver.
 (i) denotes driver who are ineligible for series driver points.

Qualifying 
Qualifying was held on Friday, September 30, at 2:30 PM CST. Since Talladega Superspeedway is a superspeedway, the qualifying system used is a single-car, single-lap system with two rounds. In the first round, drivers have one lap to set a time. The fastest ten drivers from the first round move on to the second round. Whoever sets the fastest time in Round 2 wins the pole.

Race results 
Stage 1 Laps: 20

Stage 2 Laps: 20

Stage 3 Laps: 55*

Standings after the race 

Drivers' Championship standings

Note: Only the first 10 positions are included for the driver standings.

References 

Chevrolet Silverado 250
NASCAR races at Talladega Superspeedway
Chevrolet Silverado 250
2022 in sports in Alabama